Fulk II of Anjou (c. 905 — 960), called  ("the Good") was Count of Anjou from 942 to his death.

Life
Fulk II born  was a son of Fulk the Red and his wife Roscilla de Loches, daughter of Warnerius, Seigneur de Villentrois. He succeeded his father in 942 as the second count of Anjou, and remained in power until 960. 

The Angevins, Fulk II included, had become particularly adept at establishing marriage alliances that furthered their goals. His father, Fulk the Red had arranged his marriage to Gerberga, daughter of Geoffrey of Nevers and Aba. Among other things, this alliance enabled Fulk to open the doors towards Aquitaine for his daughter, Adelaide-Blanche, to marry a future king of France (Aba was likely a daughter of William I, Duke of Aquitaine, and Engelberga, thus of royal blood) and for his son Guy to become Bishop of le Puy.

After Gerberga's death  Fulk made another astute political marriage to the widow of Alan II, Duke of Brittany. Alan II had also been Count of Nantes and through this marriage Fulk gained influence in, and possibly control of, Nantes. His second wife was also the sister of Theobald I, Count of Blois which permitted Fulk II to form an alliance with the House of Blois. He is said to have ordered the murder of Drogo, Duke of Brittany, Alan II's son with the latter according to the Chronique de Nantes.

Family
By his spouse Gerberge   Fulk II had several children:
 Adelaide-Blanche of Anjou, married four or five times.
 Geoffrey I, Count of Anjou, married Adelaide of Vermandois.
 Bouchard, Count of Vendome.
 Guy of Anjou, Bishop of le Puy.
 Humbert d'Anjou, mentioned 957.

Fulk II had no known issue with his second wife.

Death
Fulk died in 960, at age of 55. He was succeeded by his 20-year-old son Geoffrey Greymantle.

Notes

References

House of Ingelger
Counts of Anjou
900s births
960 deaths
Year of birth uncertain
10th-century French people